The 1994 Louisville Cardinals football team represented the University of Louisville as an independent during the 1994 NCAA Division I-A football season. Led by Howard Schnellenberger in his tenth and final season as head coach, the Cardinals compiled a record of 6–5. The team played their home games in Cardinal Stadium in Louisville, Kentucky.

Schedule

References

Louisville
Louisville Cardinals football seasons
Louisville Cardinals football